Durgapur is a village in Shaheed Bhagat Singh Nagar district (NawanShahr) of Punjab State, India. The village is administrated by Sarpanch an elected representative of the village.

Demography 
As of 2011, Durgapur has a total number of 163 houses and population of 794 of which 407 include are males while 387 are females according to the report published by Census India in 2011. The literacy rate of Durgapur is 80.44%, higher than the state average of 75.84%. The population of children under the age of 6 years is 68 which is 8.56% of total population of Durgapur, and child sex ratio is approximately 889 as compared to Punjab state average of 846.

Most of the people are from Schedule Caste which constitutes 40.55% of total population in Durgapur. The town does not have any Schedule Tribe population so far.

As per the report published by Census India in 2011, 245 people were engaged in work activities out of the total population of Durgapur which includes 219 males and 26 females. According to census survey report 2011, 92.24% workers describe their work as main work and 7.76% workers are involved in Marginal activity providing livelihood for less than 6 months.

Education 
The village has a Punjabi medium, co-ed primary school founded in 1992. The schools does not provide mid-day meal. The school provide free education to children between the ages of 6 and 14 as per Right of Children to Free and Compulsory Education Act. The village also has an English medium, co-ed private un-aided primary with upper primary school founded in 2004. KC Engineering College and Doaba Khalsa Trust Group Of Institutions are the nearest colleges.

Notable people 
Punjabi language Bhangra singer-songwriter Jazzy B was born in Durgapur.

Transport 

See also 
List of villages in India

References

External links 
 Tourism of Punjab
 Census of Punjab
 Locality Based PINCode

Villages in Shaheed Bhagat Singh Nagar district